The 2016 World University Handball Championship was the 23rd edition of this Handball Event organized by the FISU and it was held in the city of Antequera, Spain, from 27 June to 3 July.

Participating teams

Men

Women

Medal summary

Men's tournament

Group A

Group B

Knockout stage

5th–8th place play-offs

5–8th place semi-finals

Semi-finals

7th place game

5th place game

Bronze medal game

Gold medal game

Final standing

Women's tournament

Group Y

Group Z

Knockout stage

5th–8th place play-offs

5–8th place semi-finals

Semi-finals

7th place game

5th place game

Bronze medal game

Gold medal game

Final standing

References

External links
FISU Official Website
Championship Official Website

Handball
University handball championship
2016 in Spanish sport
International handball competitions hosted by Spain
History of the province of Málaga
World University Handball Championship